Trichoderma asperellum Samuels, Lieckf & Nirenberg  is a species of fungus in the family Hypocreaceae. It can be distinguished from T. viride by molecular and phenotypic characteristics. The most important molecular characteristics are divergent ITS-1 and 28S sequences and RFLP's of the endochitinase gene. Main phenotypic characters are conidial ornamentation and arrangement and branching of the conidiophores.

Important Isolates
This species has been used commercially and experimentally as a biopesticide for plant disease control: some commercial isolates were previously placed in T. harzianum.

References

External links
 
 

Trichoderma
Biopesticides
Biotechnology
Biological pest control
Fungi described in 1999